Euna Lee (Hangul:유나 리; born 1972) is a Korean American journalist.  
While working for Current TV, Lee and fellow journalist Laura Ling were detained in North Korea after they crossed into the Democratic People's Republic of Korea from the People's Republic of China without a visa. They were found guilty of illegal entry and sentenced to twelve years' hard labor in June 2009. The United States Government protested the sentences, and implemented diplomatic efforts in order to secure the release of both Lee and Ling.  On 4 August 2009, Lee and Ling were pardoned by the North Korean government after a special humanitarian visit by former U.S. President Bill Clinton. She wrote a book on her experiences in North Korea titled The World Is Bigger Now: An American Journalist's Release from Captivity in North Korea ... A Remarkable Story of Faith, Family, and Forgiveness.

Biography

Lee was born and raised in South Korea, and moved to the United States in order to attend Academy of Art University, where she received a Bachelor of Fine Arts degree in Film and Broadcasting. She graduated from the Columbia University Graduate School of Journalism in 2012. She is married to actor Michael Saldate; they have a daughter, Hana.

On 4 August 2009, Bill Clinton visited North Korea in an attempt to free Lee and fellow journalist Laura Ling. The North Korean government pardoned both Lee and Ling after meeting with Clinton that day. It is also said that the equipment and materials they used for their interviews were left behind in the North Korea, and that information about defectors and human rights activists who helped them in their interviews was obtained by the North Korean authorities, putting them in danger. Human rights activists in South Korea accused Lee and Ling of placing North Korean refugees in danger through their actions.

Awards and honours
In 2011, Lee and Ling received the McGill Medal for Journalistic Courage from the Grady College of Journalism and Mass Communication.

See also
 2009 imprisonment of American journalists by North Korea
 List of foreign nationals detained in North Korea
 Han Park

References

External links

Euna Lee reunite with family
Journalist Euna Lee  at 백지연의 피플Inside

1972 births
Living people
American people of Korean descent
North Korea–United States relations
People from Sacramento County, California
Prisoners and detainees of North Korea
South Korean journalists
South Korean women journalists
Current TV people
American people imprisoned abroad
Recipients of North Korean pardons
Academy of Art University alumni
Date of birth missing (living people)
American women television journalists
Columbia University Graduate School of Journalism alumni